Animals in Translation: Using the Mysteries of Autism to Decode Animal Behavior  is a 2005 book by Temple Grandin and co-written by Catherine Johnson. Animals in Translation explores the similarity between animals and people with autism, a concept that was originally touched upon in Grandin's 1995 book Thinking in Pictures: My Life with Autism.

Background

Temple Grandin is a specialist in animal behavior, has received a Ph.D. from the University of Illinois, and is a professor at Colorado State University.  Grandin works as a consultant to the American beef industry, designing slaughterhouse equipment  that has been extensively adopted within the United States agricultural industry, even being employed by McDonald's.   An estimated 90% of all cattle slaughtered in the United States and Canada are done so according to standards and equipment designed by Grandin.  Oliver Sacks's 1995 book An Anthropologist on Mars included Grandin as part of a neurological study. This book first brought Grandin to the public's attention, with her self description of her experiences being like an "anthropologist on Mars" being used as the title.

Content

In Grandin's second book Thinking in Pictures: My Life with Autism (released in 1995), she explained how her brain receives input as a typical person's brain does, but rather than converting it into words it remains visual.  Animals in Translation expands on this concept, suggesting that her autism allows her to focus on visual details more intensely, which allows her to "take in the world as animals do". Grandin suggests that people with autism are similar to animals, as they "see, feel and think in remarkably similar ways". Based on this idea, Grandin goes on to explain that all animals are more intelligent and more sensitive than humans assume them to be, and should be given a "good life...with something useful to do".

In Animals in Translation, Grandin's explains her theory of why people with autism and animals are so similar. Grandin's theory is that the frontal lobes of people with autism do not function the same as those of typical person, and the brain function of a person with autism falls "between human and animal". Grandin goes on to explain that while typical people are good at seeing the "big picture", people with autism are more detail oriented. Grandin's sensitivity to details has allowed her to see things that humans have been doing to animals for years that are "traumatizing" them, even maintaining a list of "18 tiny details that scare farm animals".  The list includes things such as reflections on smooth metal, jiggling chains, and one-way gates.

References

2005 non-fiction books
Books about autism
Books about animal rights
Books by Temple Grandin